Néstor Marcelo Narbona Pizarro (born 23 January 1979) is a former footballer who is last known to have played as a defender for La Serena. Born in Chile, he was a Palestine international.

References

External links

1979 births
Living people
Chilean footballers
Deportes La Serena footballers
Palestine international footballers
Association football defenders